The Social Defence Committee (CDS) was a Spanish conservative catholic organization founded in Barcelona in 1903.

References

Bibliography
 

Defunct political parties in Spain
Political parties established in 1903
Political parties disestablished in 1923
1903 establishments in Spain
1923 disestablishments in Spain